William Wolfe Wagner was an Irish Anglican clergyman.

Wagner was educated at Trinity College, Dublin and ordained in 1887. After Curacies in Kileevan and Drumreilly, he was the incumbent at Kilmactranny from  1893 until 1910. He was Archdeacon of Elphin from then until his death in 1937.

References 

Irish Anglicans
Archdeacons of Elphin
Alumni of Trinity College Dublin
1937 deaths